Pirijed (also Romanized as Pīrījed; also known as Pīr Jad, Pīr Jād, and Tang-e Parījeh) is a village in Robat Rural District, in the Central District of Khorramabad County, Lorestan Province, Iran. At the 2006 census, its population was 102, in 22 families.

References 

Towns and villages in Khorramabad County